Robert Jacobs may refer to:

 Robert Jacobs (Homefront), a character in the videogame Homefront
 Robert Jacobs, a character in the video game Call of Duty: Vanguard
 Robert Nelson Jacobs (born 1954), American screenwriter